Lithabaneng is a constituency and community council in the Maseru Municipality located in the Maseru District of Lesotho. The population in 2006 was 28,371.

Villages
The community of Lithabaneng includes the villages of Borokhoaneng, Botšabelo, Ha Keiso (Lithabaneng), Ha Khechane, Ha Leqele, Ha Matala, Ha Nelese, Lefikeng (Lithabaneng), Lepereng, Lithabaneng, Makoanyane, Matala Phase II, Mathokoane, Sekoting, Sekoting (Ha Leqele) and Upper Thamae.

Education and Health Care
The SOS Children's Village Maseru situated in Lithabaneng contains; a kindergarten with a capacity of 125 children, a primary school with a capacity of 490 children, family housing, social centre, youth facility and a medical centre that can provide medical treatment to up to 1,000 patients per month.

References

External links
 Google map of community villages

Populated places in Maseru District